Saguenay Fire was a forest fire in Saguenay–Lac-Saint-Jean area, Quebec, Canada, on Wednesday, May 18, 1870, which lasted for one day. It was one of the largest fires in the region. It burned a total area of 4,000 square kilometers (0.4 million hectares). Seven people were killed, many were injured, and hundreds of families lost everything they owned.

Origin 
The settlers in this region were clearing the land with brush fires. The controlled burn turned into a massive forest fire due to dry conditions, which was further fueled by felled trees and strong winds.

Description 

The wildfire spread rapidly, and in a few hours, it burned everything in the 150-kilometer region. Residents of the area did not get time to gather their valuables and were forced to take refuge in the nearest area of water. Seven people died in the fire, and one-third of the entire Saguenay region population lost their homes and valuable possessions. By May 19, the fire burnt itself out.

Optical Effects 
The wildfire gave rise to unusual optical effects on 22 and 23 May 1870. The ‘strange’ appearance of the sun and sky was widely observed in Ireland and a few parts of British Isles.

Consequences 
Agriculture in the area was severely impacted. More than 500 farming families lost everything.  The fire lasted for one day, but a huge plume of smoke particles propagated towards the east due to the upper winds.

Benefits 
The fire destroyed hundreds of miles of forests along its shores. The fire cleared the land for farming and opened up the Lac St.-Jean area. The fields after the fire were ready to be cultivated. It attracted many farmers. The fire helped in the growth of blueberries. Berry-picking has become a popular tourist activity in the region..

References 

Wildfires in Canada
Natural disasters in Quebec
1870 natural disasters
1870 in Quebec
1870 fires in North America
1870 disasters in Canada
19th-century wildfires